The 1959–60 WHL season was the eighth season of the Western Hockey League. The Vancouver Canucks were the President's Cup champions as they beat the Victoria Cougars in five games to two in the final series. 

Both the Saskatoon Quakers and New Westminster Royals announced they would not play the season, leaving the league with seven teams.

Final standings 

bold – qualified for playoffs

Playoffs 

The Vancouver Canucks defeated the Victoria Cougars 5 games to 2 to win the President's Cup.

All Star Team

References

Bibliography

 
 

Western Hockey League (1952–1974) seasons
1959–60 in American ice hockey by league
1959–60 in Canadian ice hockey by league